Omphile Mankoba Confidence Maotwe is a South African politician. On 14 December 2019, she was elected Treasurer-General of the Economic Freedom Fighters, succeeding Leigh-Ann Mathys. Maotwe became a Member of Parliament on 31 October 2019. She was previously involved with the EFF in Gauteng, serving as the party's spokeswoman and treasurer.

References

External links
Omphile Mankoba Confidence Maotwe – People's Assembly
Ms Omphile Mankoba Confidence Maotwe – Parliament of South Africa

Living people
Members of the National Assembly of South Africa
Economic Freedom Fighters politicians
People from Gauteng
Politicians from Gauteng
Year of birth missing (living people)
Women members of the National Assembly of South Africa